Whispering Smith Speaks is a 1935 American action film directed by David Howard and written by Daniel Jarrett, Don Swift, Rex Taylor and Gilbert Wright. The film stars George O'Brien, Irene Ware, Kenneth Thomson, Maude Allen, Spencer Charters and Victor Potel. The film was released on December 20, 1935, by 20th Century Fox.

Plot

Cast
George O'Brien as Gordon Harrington Jr. aka John 'Whispering' Smith
Irene Ware as Nan Roberts
Kenneth Thomson as J. Wesley Hunt
Maude Allen as Mrs. Roberts
Spencer Charters as Cal Stone
Victor Potel as Bill Prouty
Edward Keane as Rebstock
Frank Sheridan as Gordon Harrington Sr.
William V. Mong as Blake
Maurice Cass as C. Luddington Colfax

References

External links
 

1935 films
American action adventure films
1930s action adventure films
20th Century Fox films
Films directed by David Howard
American black-and-white films
1930s English-language films
1930s American films